Vladislav Knotko-Shterk (born 1 July 1995) is a Belarusian professional footballer. As of 2020, he plays for Ostrovets.

References

External links 
 
 

1995 births
Living people
Belarusian footballers
Association football defenders
FC Torpedo-BelAZ Zhodino players
FC Luch Minsk (2012) players
FC Krumkachy Minsk players
FC Smolevichi players
FC Molodechno players
FC Ostrovets players